The 1957 Segunda División de Chile was the sixth season of the Segunda División de Chile.

Deportes La Serena was the tournament's winner.

Table

Final

See also
Chilean football league system

References

External links
 RSSSF 1957

Segunda División de Chile (1952–1995) seasons
Primera B
Chil